Edge Hill is an inner suburb of the city of Cairns in Far North Queensland, Australia located approximately four kilometres north west of the city centre. It is a popular residential area surrounded by the forested hills of the Mount Whitfield Conservation Park to the north and west. The hub of the suburb contains shops, cafes and restaurants as well as the Cairns Botanic Gardens and Centenary Lakes.

History 
Edge Hill is situated in the Yidinji traditional Aboriginal country. 
The origin of the suburb name is from the name given to the township developed near the historical Edgecliff quarry site. This township became
known as Edge Hill because of the location situated on the foothills of Mount Whitfield. 

Edge Hill State School opened on 5 February 1940.

Heritage listings 
Edge Hill has the following heritage listings:
 Collins Avenue: Flecker Botanical Gardens
 Collins Avenue: WWII RAN Fuel Installation

References

External links 

 

Suburbs of Cairns